USS Grosbeak is a name used more than once by the U.S. Navy:

 , was renamed from Fanny and was purchased at Mound City, Illinois on 3 February 1865
 , was a patrol boat that served during World War I
 , was a coastal minesweeper that served during World War II
 , was a minesweeper commissioned 18 November 1943
 A contract for constructing Grosbeak (AM-397) was awarded to the Defoe Shipbuilding Company in Bay City, Michigan, but construction was canceled by the US Navy on 12 August 1945 before her keel had been laid

United States Navy ship names